Rondelet is a French surname. Notable people with the surname include:

 Guillaume Rondelet (1507–1566), French professor of medicine
 Jean-Baptiste Rondelet (1743–1829), French architectural theorist

French-language surnames